Chester Field may refer to:

 Perryville Municipal Airport, formerly Chester Army Airfield, Perryville, Missouri, United States
 Chester Field (Laurel Bay, South Carolina), prehistoric shell ring

See also
 Chesterfield (disambiguation)